
Year 351 (CCCLI) was a common year starting on Tuesday (link will display the full calendar) of the Julian calendar. At the time, it was known as the Year of the Consulship of Magnentius and Gaiso (or, less frequently, year 1104 Ab urbe condita). The denomination 351 for this year has been used since the early medieval period, when the Anno Domini calendar era became the prevalent method in Europe for naming years.

Events 
 By place 

 Roman Empire 
 March 15 – Emperor Constantius II elevates his 25-year-old cousin Constantius Gallus to Caesar at Sirmium (Pannonia). He arranges a marriage with his sister Constantina, and puts him in charge of the Eastern Roman Empire. 
 Constantius marches West with a large field army (around 60,000 men) to topple Magnus Magnentius in Pannonia.
 May 7 – The Jewish revolt against Constantius Gallus breaks out. After his arrival at Antioch, the Jews begin a rebellion in Palestine. The Roman garrison in the town of Diocesarea is wiped out.  
 September 28 – Battle of Mursa Major: Constantius II defeats the usurper Magnentius along the valley of the Drava. The battle is one of the bloodiest in Roman military history. During the fighting Marcellinus, a general of Magnentius is killed; Magnentius himself survives.
 Winter – Magnentius flees to Aquileia in northern Italy and fortifies the mountain passes in the Alps.

 China 
 Emperor Shi Zhi is killed by Ran Min's forces, an action that sets the stage for Wei's victory in the Wei–Jie war. 
 Fú Jiàn declares himself "Heavenly Prince" (Tian Wang) during the collapse of Later Zhao, and establishes Former Qin.

 By topic 

 Art and Science 
 In India, a new process makes possible the extraction of sugar from sugarcane.

 Religion 
 Macedonius is restored as Patriarch of Constantinople.

Births 
 Princess Dowager Helan, mother of Wei Daowudi (d. 396) 
 Li Gao, Chinese general of the state Western Liang (d. 417)

Deaths 
 September 28 – Flavius Romulus, Roman consul
 Marcellinus, Roman general (magister officiorum)
 Shi Zhi, Chinese prince and emperor of Later Zhao

References